Evgeny Lapin (born May 8, 1980) is a Russian former professional ice hockey forward who played in the Kontinental Hockey League (KHL). He last played in for HC Sibir Novosibirsk in the KHL before completing his career in the Supreme Hockey League with Buran Voronezh

References

External links

1980 births
Living people
Buran Voronezh players
HC CSKA Moscow players
HC Dynamo Moscow players
Metallurg Novokuznetsk players
HC MVD players
HC Sibir Novosibirsk players
SKA Saint Petersburg players
Russian ice hockey forwards
Sportspeople from Lipetsk